Plaisance is an album by musician Eddy Grant. The title of this album is a reference to the town of Plaisance, Guyana, where Eddy Grant was born in 1948.

Track listing
"Down the Road Again" – 4:33
"I'm the One" – 3:15
"Key to Your Heart" – 3:46
"Now We're All Together" – 3:22
"Mind the Gap" – 5:38
"Heroes on the Run" – 4:16
"Up Against the Wall" – 4:08
"Real Black and Blue" – 5:28
"True to You" – 3:37
"Shak-Shak" – 7:54
"Is Carol King Here" – 5:41
"Let's Get Started" – 4:22
"The Perfect One" – 3:15
"I Belong to You" - 4:29

References

2017 albums
Eddy Grant albums